Wings of Adventure is a 1930 American action adventure film directed by Richard Thorpe and starring Rex Lease, Armida and Clyde Cook.  It was produced and distributed by Tiffany Pictures.

Cast
 Rex Lease as 	Dave Kent
 Armida as Maria Valdez
 Clyde Cook as Pete 'Skeets' Smith
 Fred Malatesta as 	Don Ricardo Diaz San Pablo La Pandella - 'La Panthera'
 Nadja as Cabaret Dancer
 Eddie Boland as 	Viva
 Charles K. French as U.S. Army Major
 Nick De Ruiz as 	Manuel - Bandito Leader
 Bruce Covington as 	Soldier
 Steve Clemente as Bandit 
 Chris-Pin Martin as Lopez

References

Bibliography
 Fetrow, Alan G. . Sound films, 1927-1939: a United States Filmography. McFarland, 1992.
 Pitts, Michael R. Poverty Row Studios, 1929-1940. McFarland & Company, 2005.

External links
 

1930 films
1930 adventure films
1930s English-language films
American adventure films
Tiffany Pictures films
Films directed by Richard Thorpe
American black-and-white films
1930s American films